Montgomery Elevator Company was a vertical transportation company founded in 1892, but entered the elevator business in 1910, acquired Roelofson Elevator of Galt Ontario in the early 1960s and operated it as its Canadian Division.  Montgomery manufactured elevators, escalators, and moving walkways until 1994, when it was acquired by KONE. Montgomery was the 4th-largest elevator company in the U.S. at the time.
After Montgomery was acquired, they worked with KONE to make elevators and escalators under the brand name Montgomery KONE, but only for 6 years until the full integration into KONE US in 2000. 

One of the most unusual Montgomery elevators in the world is the elevator tramway in the St. Louis Gateway Arch.

See also
 List of elevator manufacturers

Elevator manufacturers
Escalator manufacturers
American companies established in 1892
Manufacturing companies established in 1892
1892 establishments in Illinois
1994 disestablishments in Illinois